José Galofré y Coma (1819-1877), a Spanish historical painter, was born at Barcelona, and died in the same city. He studied in Rome, where he became an associate of Overbeck. In 1854 he painted for the Queen of Spain An Episode from the Conquest of Granada in 1494. He also published a book on Art in Italy and other Countries of Europe.

Notes

References
 

1819 births
1877 deaths
19th-century Spanish painters
19th-century Spanish male artists
Spanish male painters
People from Barcelona
19th-century painters of historical subjects